Unambiguous acquisition is the acquisition of GNSS signals that present ambiguities in their autocorrelation function, namely the signals that are modulated with a modulation belonging to the Binary Offset Carrier modulation class.

References

References

Further reading
A. Burian, E.S. Lohan, and M.  Renfors, Efficient Delay Tracking Methods with Sidelobes Cancellation for BOC-Modulated Signals, EURASIP Journal on Wireless Communications and Networking, Volume 2007 (2007), Article ID 72626,
M. Navarro Gallardo, G. Seco-Granados, G. López-Risueño, M. Crisci, "Code Smoothing for BOC Ambiguity Mitigation", Proc. International Conference on Localization and GNSS (ICL-GNSS), 2013 
O. Julien, C. Macabiau, M. Cannon, and G. Lachapelle, “BOC signal acquisition and tracking method and apparatus.” US Patent Application Publication 2005/0270997 A1, Dec 2005 
F. Benedetto, G. Giunta, E. S. Lohan, and M. Renfors, “A Fast Unambiguous Acquisition Algorithm for BOC-Modulated Signals”, IEEE TRANSACTIONS ON VEHICULAR TECHNOLOGY, VOL. 62, NO. 3, MARCH 2013 
Z. Yao, “Unambiguous technique for multiplexed binary offset carrier modulated signals tracking,” IEEE Signal Process. Lett., vol. 16, no. 7,pp. 608–611, 2009.

Satellite navigation